Phon Ngam is a tambon (subdistrict) of Det Udom District, in Ubon Ratchathani Province, Thailand. In 2021, it had a population of 9,117 people. Neighbouring subdistricts are (clockwise from the south) Klang, Mueang Det, Kut Prathai, and Kham Khrang.

History
The region was first settled in 1906 by a group of 30 households led by Butprom Santa (บุตรพรม สันตะ); the first village was named "Nong Yaow" (หนองยาว; Long Pond),  after the title of the pond nearby, and was followed by the second and third waves of the settlement in the 1940s.

The tambon was created in 1986 by separating the district's capital, Mueang Det, into two halves, the eastern of which was named Phon Ngam subdistrict. While the Phon Ngam subdistrict is much older, the Tambon administrative organization (TAO) as the local administration unit was established in 1996. Effective October 27, 2009, it was upgraded to a subdistrict municipality.

Geography
The tambon was located in the central region of the Det Udom district, which is the low river plain of the Lam Dom Yai river, and covered 36 kilometers squares.

Administration
The tambon is divided into eight administrative villages (mubans; หมู่บ้าน) which are further divided into thirteen community groups (Mu; หมู่). All of which were governed by the Phon Ngam subdistrict municipality (เทศบาลตำบลโพนงาม).

The following is a list of the subdistrict's mubans, which roughly correspond to the villages:

References

Tambon of Ubon Ratchathani Province